The 1904 United States presidential election in Michigan took place on November 8, 1904, as part of the 1904 United States presidential election. Voters chose 14 representatives, or electors, to the Electoral College, who voted for president and vice president.

Background
Following the Panic of 1893 and the Populist movement, Michigan would turn from a competitive Republican-leaning state into a rigidly one-party polity dominated by the Republican Party. The dominance of the culture of the Lower Peninsula by anti-slavery Yankees would be augmented by the turn of formerly Democratic-leaning German Catholics away from that party as a result of the remodelled party’s agrarian and free silver sympathies, which became rigidly opposed by both the upper class and workers who followed them. A brief turn of the strongly evangelical Cabinet Counties toward the Populist movement in the 1896 United States presidential election would reverse itself following the return to prosperity under President William McKinley, so that these joined in Republican hegemony until the Great Depression.

In the 1894 elections, the Democratic Party lost all but one seat in the Michigan legislature, and the party would only make minor gains there for the next third of a century. Unlike the other states of the Upper Midwest, the Yankee influence on the culture of the Lower Peninsula was so strong that left-wing third parties did not provide significant opposition to the Republicans, nor was there more than a moderate degree of coordinated factionalism within the hegemonic Michigan Republican Party.

Vote
Although Michigan’s few Democrats had cast their vote for eventual nominee Alton Brooks Parker, they ultimately did nothing to campaign for him during his fall campaign, as polls consistently showed that Michigan would vote overwhelmingly Republican. Incumbent Republican Theodore Roosevelt did briefly visit the state during his campaign, but did no extensive work because the state was believed so safe. Predictions of a Roosevelt margin of 200,000 were conservative as in the end he defeated Parker by over 227,000 votes.

Roosevelt became the first presidential candidate to win all 83 of Michigan’s counties, and furthermore carried them all by double digits; his lowest vote share in any county was 56.95%, in Monroe County. Parker broke forty percent only in Monroe County and thirty percent in just fourteen counties. In most of the sparsely populated Upper Peninsula, Roosevelt carried over eighty percent of the vote, and in two counties even exceeded ninety percent.

Results

Results by county

See also
 United States presidential elections in Michigan

Notes

References

Michigan
1904
1904 Michigan elections